Tom Woods (born 29 October 1962) is a Canadian rugby union player. He played in 19 matches for the Canada national rugby union team from 1984 to 1997, playing at the 1987 Rugby World Cup and the 1991 Rugby World Cup.

References

1962 births
Living people
Canadian rugby union players
Canada international rugby union players
Place of birth missing (living people)